Nancy Foner is an American sociologist, a Distinguished Professor of Sociology at Hunter College, City University of New York, and a published author. 

Foner is also a member of the American Academy of Arts and Sciences. She has also held the professorships of Distinguished Professor of Anthropology at State University of New York and also Lillie and Nathan Ackerman Visiting Professor of Equality and Justice at Baruch College, City University of New York. 

Foner has served as president of the Eastern Sociological Society (2014-15), chair of the International Migration Section of the American Sociological Association, and president of the Society for the Anthropology of Work and the Society for Urban, National, and Transnational/Global Anthropology.

She is the daughter of Moe and Anne Foner, a sociology professor. She is the niece of Henry Foner and his wife Lorraine Lieberman as well as older brothers (and twins) Jack D. and Philip S. Foner.

Publications
 From Ellis Island to JFK: New York’s Two Great Waves of Immigration (Yale University Press, 2000)
 In a New Land: A Comparative View of Immigration (New York University Press, 2005) 
 Not Just Black and White: Historical and Contemporary Perspectives on Immigration, Race, and Ethnicity in the United States (edited with George Fredrickson, 2004)
 New Immigrants in New York (Columbia University Press, revised edition, 2001)
 Islands in the City: West Indian Migration to New York (University of California Press, 2001)
 and Immigration Research for a New Century: Multidisciplinary Perspectives (edited with Ruben Rumbaut and Steven J. Gold, 2000). 
 Across Generations: Immigrant Families in America (New York University Press, 2009)

References

External sources
 Hunter College: Nancy Foner
 CUNY: Nancy Foner
 Roosevelt Institute: Nancy Foner
 Migration Policy Institute: Nancy Foner

Year of birth missing (living people)
American Jews
American sociologists
American women sociologists
Brandeis University alumni
City University of New York faculty
Graduate Center, CUNY faculty
Hunter College faculty
Living people
University of Chicago alumni